Shovel Headed Kill Machine is the seventh studio album by the American thrash metal band Exodus, released on October 4, 2005 through Nuclear Blast. It's the first album to feature new vocalist Rob Dukes, after the departure of Steve "Zetro" Souza during the band's South American tour in support of the band's previous album Tempo of the Damned. It is also the band's first studio album not to feature Rick Hunolt on guitars, with Lee Altus as his replacement, and the only Exodus album to feature Paul Bostaph on drums after Tom Hunting's second departure as a result of the reoccurrence of the illness that prompted him to depart in 1989. Shovel Headed Kill Machine sold over 3,000 copies in its first week of release in the U.S.

Reception
In a review in Terrorizer, the album was praised as "a tremendous effort in its own right and an air guitarist's wet dream".

Track listing
All songs written by Gary Holt except where noted.

Personnel
 Rob Dukes – vocals
 Gary Holt – guitars
 Lee Altus – guitars
 Jack Gibson – bass
 Paul Bostaph – drums

Production
 Produced by Gary Holt
 Engineered by Juan Urteaga
 Recorded at Trident Studio
 Mixed and Mastered by Andy Sneap at Backstage Studios in Derby, UK
 Management: Steven Warner
 A&R: Jaap Wagemaker

References 

2005 albums
Exodus (American band) albums
Nuclear Blast albums